The Game Manufacturers Association (GAMA) is a non-profit trade association based in Columbus, Ohio, dedicated to the advancement of the non-electronic social games industry – Board/Tabletop Games, Miniatures Games, Card Games, Collectable/Tradeable Card Games, Role-Playing Games, and Live-Action Role Playing Games. Its members are game manufacturers, retailers, distributors, suppliers, conventions, clubs, and independent professionals related to the games industry.

The association was formed in 1977 to protect the interests of the Origins Game Fair, and was incorporated as a non-profit venture in 1982.

GAMA organizes two shows each year, the GAMA Trade Show (GTS) in Reno, Nevada – a professional trade show aimed at game retailers, and the Origins Game Fair in Columbus, Ohio – a 15,000 person consumer show that is aimed at the game-playing public. 

GAMA has a number of programs designed to advance hobby games as a business. The Games in Education program strives to teach educators how they can use games in their curricula. The retailer mentoring program is aimed at helping new game stores become successful businesses. The Industry Watch Committee helps stores and publishers deal with negative press about games. In all they do, they endeavor to strengthen the business of publishing and selling games.

In 2006 GAMA began the Games to Troops program, working with the MWR offices of all four US military service branches to establish a permanent games library at every MWR station on the US front lines. The social games industry has since sent over a quarter of a million dollars in games to the US troops through this program.

External links 
 http://www.gama.org/
 http://www.originsgamefair.com/

Non-profit organizations based in Ohio
Game manufacturers
1977 establishments in Ohio
Economy of Columbus, Ohio
Organizations established in 1977